Jaboticabal Atlético, commonly known as Jaboticabal, is a currently inactive Brazilian football club based in Jaboticabal, São Paulo state.

History
The club was founded on 30 April 1911. They won the Campeonato Paulista Segunda Divisão in 1989 and in 1996, and the Campeonato Paulista Série A3 in 1990.

Achievements
 Campeonato Paulista Série A3:
 Winners (1): 1990
 Campeonato Paulista Segunda Divisão:
 Winners (2): 1989, 1996

Stadium
Jaboticabal Atlético play their home games at Estádio Doutor Robert Todd Locke, also known as Estádio Todd Locke. The stadium has a maximum capacity of 10,450 people.

References

Inactive football clubs in Brazil
Association football clubs established in 1911
Football clubs in São Paulo (state)
1911 establishments in Brazil